Enschede Broncos, American Football club from Enschede, the Netherlands

History

Enschede Wariors 
Founded in 1985 by Marc Kuizenga and some other enthusiasts, the Warriors started playing in the Dutch 2nd league. The Warriors are the only good organised team Enschede had in years. After beating the Lelystad Lizards in the friendship bowl and the Zaandam Giants in the Runners-up Bowl the Enschede Warriors had the opportunity to play in the highest Dutch league. Most players didn't or couldn't play at such level and the warriors chose to stay in the 2nd league. Many players went to play for other team in the next season. Frank Versteeg (RB, The Hague Raiders), Job Posthumus (OL, Amsterdam Crusaders) and Onno Hinrichs (LB, Utrecht Vikings) went playing in the Dutch highest league. The Warriors stopped in 1993 because of mismanagement and a lack of players.

During active years the Enschede Warriors were being coached by several coaches as Robert Poindexter. Under Coach Poindexter the Warriors had an undefeated season in 1988.

Enschede Broncos 
In 2003 a new team was founded in Enschede, the Enschede Broncos. They started playing  their first season of competitive matches in 2011.

In 2012, the Broncos acquired their own home field, including goalposts. Their home field is part of the sports complex Wethouder Horstman Sportpark in Enschede, which is shared with a rugby club and two soccer clubs.

On March 3, 2013, the Broncos celebrated their 10th anniversary. They played a home game against the Eindhoven Raptors, which they won. In that 2013 season, they went on to obtain a spot in the 3rd Division finals. They lost against the undefeated Rotterdam Trojans.

Two years later, in 2015, they reached the 1st Division finals under rookie HC Joeri Constandse. However, they lost, again, from an undefeated team; the Groningen Giants.

Due to a lack of players, the Broncos weren’t able to play the 2018 season.

In 2019 they made a comeback under head coach Dennis van Beek with a team full of rookies and some of the players from the old team.

Current roster 

American football teams in the Netherlands
2003 establishments in the Netherlands
American football teams established in 2003